Oum Toub District is a district of Skikda Province, Algeria.

Districts of Skikda Province